Sharna Gail Fernandez is a South African politician and former banker who serves as the Western Cape Provincial Minister of Social Development. A member of the governing Democratic Alliance, she also serves as a Member of the Western Cape Provincial Parliament. She served as the Speaker of the Western Cape Provincial Parliament from 2014 to 2019.

Early life and career
Fernandez grew up in Retreat on the Cape Flats and matriculated from the South Peninsula High School. 

Fernandez has served a thirty-year career working in three of the four large South African banks and has held the positions of Regional Manager, Sales and Service and acting General Manager of the ABSA mortgage division.

In August 2009, Fernandez was diagnosed with the H1N1 virus and was forced to take early retirement in order to restore her health. Her recovery period lasted three years and once it ended, Fernandez started doing community work and became actively involved in civic matters. She served as Chairperson of the local neighbourhood watch and joined and participated in many local community structures. She joined the Democratic Alliance in 2011 and has held various positions, such as chairperson of Ward 72 (Princess Vlei) and deputy chairperson of South Peninsula 2 constituency. She is currently constituency head of the Athlone 1 region in the City of Cape Town municipality.

In 2014, Fernandez was elected a Member of the Western Cape Provincial Parliament. It was announced after the elections that she would be the Democratic Alliance's candidate for the position of Speaker of the Provincial Parliament.
On 21 May 2014, the legislature reconvened for its first sitting of the Fifth Parliament. Judge President of the Western Cape High Court, John Hlope, presided over the election of Speaker. The largest opposition party, African National Congress, nominated Maurencia Gillion as their candidate. The vote was held by means of a secret ballot. Fernandez won the election. Fernandez was also designated to be the chairperson of the Rules Committee.

In September 2018, Fernandez declared herself to be a candidate to replace Patricia de Lille as Mayor of Cape Town as De Lille announced in August 2018, that she would step down in October 2018 after months of legal battles with the Democratic Alliance. She was one of many candidates, alongside former Mayor Dan Plato and Deputy Mayor Ian Neilson.

Her candidacy focused on regaining the trust of the people of Cape Town by serving the people's needs and addressing crime in the city.

She subsequently lost to Dan Plato, when the Democratic Alliance announced in September 2018 that Plato is their preferred candidate to be mayor.

Following the May 2019 elections, Fernandez was succeeded by Masizole Mnqasela as Speaker of the Western Cape Provincial Parliament. She was appointed Provincial Minister of Social Development.

Personal life
She is a Cape Filipina, with ancestry from Simon's Town and Kalk Bay.

Fernandez has lived in many South African provinces, such as the North West, Gauteng and Free State before returning to the Western Cape in 2009.

References

External links
 

Year of birth missing (living people)
Living people
Members of the Western Cape Provincial Parliament
Democratic Alliance (South Africa) politicians
Women members of provincial legislatures of South Africa
Women legislative speakers